The Seance is a live album by American jazz pianist Hampton Hawes recorded in 1966 but not released on the Contemporary label until 1969.

Reception 
The Allmusic review by Scott Yanow states "Hawes displays the influence of the avant-garde in places, stretching out his improvisations a bit while still showing off his roots in bop".

Track listing
 "The Seance" (Hampton Hawes) - 7:57
 "Oleo" (Sonny Rollins) - 8:40
 "Easy Street" (Alan Rankin Jones) - 5:42
 "Suddenly I Thought of You" (Hampton Hawes) - 6:56
 "For Heaven's Sake" (Elise Bretton, Donald Meyer, Sherman Edwards) - 5:13
 "My Romance" (Richard Rodgers, Lorenz Hart) - 9:46

Personnel
Hampton Hawes - piano
Red Mitchell - bass
Donald Bailey - drums

References

Contemporary Records live albums
Hampton Hawes live albums
1969 live albums